Cole  may refer to:

Plants
 Cole crops of the genus Brassica, especially cabbage, kale, or rape (rapeseed).

People
 Cole (given name), people with the given name Cole
 Cole (surname), people with the surname Cole

Companies
Cole Motor Car Company, a pioneer American name automobile company (1909–1925)

Places

Antarctic
Cole Peninsula, a peninsula on the continent of Antarctica

Canada
Cole Harbour, Nova Scotia, a community of Halifax Regional Municipality, Nova Scotia
Cole Harbour 
Cole Harbour (Guysborough), Nova Scotia

England
Cole, Somerset, a hamlet in Pitcombe parish
Cole (for Bruton) railway station, a former station in the hamlet

France
Côle, a river in southwestern France

Poland
Cole, Pomeranian Voivodeship

Northern Ireland
Cole, County Tyrone, a townland in County Tyrone, Northern Ireland

United States
Cole, Indiana, an unincorporated community in Grant County
Cole, Oklahoma, a town in McClain County, Oklahoma
Coleville, California, a town in Eastern California
Cole City, Georgia, a ghost town
Cole County, Missouri, a county located in the central part of Missouri
Cole Creek (Pennsylvania), a stream in Pennsylvania
Cole Creek (South Dakota), a stream in South Dakota
Cole Field, a baseball stadium located in Flint, Michigan
Cole's Hill, historic cemetery and settlement site of the Pilgrims in Plymouth, Massachusetts  
Cole Valley, San Francisco, California, a small neighborhood in San Francisco, California
Cole Ranch AVA, California wine region in Mendocino County
Cole County, South Dakota, the original name of Union County, South Dakota, a county located in the south-eastern corner of South Dakota
Cole Township (disambiguation)

Ships

USS Cole (DD-155), a United States Navy Wickes-class destroyer
USS Cole (DDG-67), a United States Navy Arleigh Burke-class "Aegis" guided missile destroyer
USS Cole bombing, an attack on the US military which occurred in 2000

Other uses
 Cole (film), a 2009 Canadian film
Cole Prize, an award bestowed by the American Mathematical Society for achievements in algebra, first given in 1928
 Brassica aka "cole crops", a genus of plants in the mustard family
 Justice Cole (disambiguation)
 River Cole (disambiguation)
 Cole tribe, an earlier name for Kol people of India